8th Brigade may refer to:

Argentina
8th Mountain Infantry Brigade (Argentina)

Australia
8th Brigade (Australia)

Canada
8th Canadian Infantry Brigade

India
 8th Indian Infantry Brigade in the Second World War
 8th (Jullundur) Brigade in the First World War
 8th (Lucknow) Cavalry Brigade in the First World War

Israel
8th Armored Brigade (Israel)

Lebanon
8th Infantry Brigade (Lebanon)

New Zealand
8th Brigade (New Zealand)

Romania
8th Mixed Artillery Brigade (Romania)

Spain
8th Mixed Brigade

United Kingdom
8th Armoured Brigade (United Kingdom)
8th Cavalry Brigade (United Kingdom)
8th Infantry Brigade (United Kingdom)
8th Mounted Brigade (United Kingdom)
8th Support Group (United Kingdom)
VIII Brigade RAF
 Artillery Brigades
 8th (Howitzer) Brigade Royal Field Artillery
 VIII Brigade, Royal Horse Artillery